Energy Research & Social Science is a peer-reviewed academic journal covering social science research on energy systems and energy and society, including anthropology, economics, geography, psychology, political science, social policy, sociology, science and technology studies and legal studies. It was established in 2014 and is now among the most highly ranked journals on energy and social sciences. It is published by Elsevier. The editor-in-chief is Benjamin K. Sovacool (Aarhus University and University of Sussex).

Abstracting and indexing 
The journal is abstracted and indexed in:
Social Sciences Citation Index
Scopus

See also
Climate change adaptation
Climate change mitigation
Energy policy
Renewable energy

References

External links

Publications established in 2014
Sociology journals
Elsevier academic journals
Energy and fuel journals
Monthly journals
English-language journals
Energy research